Mohd Shazuan bin Mohd Ashraf Mathews (born 12 May 1992) is a Malaysian footballer who plays for Hanelang in Malaysia FAM League. His preferred position is as a winger or as a striker.

Career
Before signing to play with Perak in 2011, he was playing with the Selangor FA Presidents Cup team in 2010. He was also selected for trial in Nike Malaysia's 'The Chance', a program to select players to enter the Nike Academy in London.

He was registered and played with the Perak President's Cup team in 2011, but was also frequently picked for the Perak senior team by head coach Norizan Bakar. He scored his first goal for Perak senior team against Perlis FA on 25 May 2011.

Honours
Kedah FA
 Malaysia Cup: 2016

References

External links
 

1992 births
Living people
Malaysian footballers
Perak F.C. players
Penang F.C. players
People from Selangor
Malaysian people of Malay descent
Association football forwards
Association football midfielders